Broken Mirrors is a 2019 Israeli drama film written and directed by Imri Matalon and Aviad Givon and starring Shira Haas. The film had its world premiere at the 2018 Rome Film Festival as part of the competition at the 18th edition of Alice in the City section. Broken Mirrors was nominated for three Ophir Awards (Best Screenplay, Lead Actress for Shira Haas, and Casting), and it won the Jury Prize at the 2019 SCHLINGEL International Film Festival. The film is distributed in Israel by United King Films and internationally by Wazabi Films.

Cast
Shira Haas as Ariela
Yiftach Klein as Giora
 as Nava
 as Ben
Liora Rivlin

References

External links
 
  from Seville International
 Jiulio Zuppello, Rome FF13 – Broken Mirrors review, cinematoggraphe 
Silvia Fabbr, Broken Mirrors, Rome FF review, .Movie Trainer
Alice Romani ,BROKEN MIRRORS Rome FFreview, operprime 
 Giorgia Terranova, Roma FF13, Broken Mirrors, review, spettacolo.eu
 Marianna Cappi, Broken Mirrors review, My movies.it
Best Films of the year-silvia-fabbri, Movie Trainer
Shira Hass Eng interview for talkimedia
Broken Mirrors at Kerala film festival- The New Indian Express
Broken Mirrors at Kinodisea fil festival - Ziare.com
Broken Mirrors at Laemmle theater - L.A
Broken Mirrors, Eng interview for ZLIN FF
Shira Haas Shines in Drama ‘Broken Mirrors’,Gerri Miller
‘Unorthodox’ Star Shira Haas Is Ready for a Big Career in Hollywood, Kate Aurthur, variety
Movie Review: Israeli melodrama “Broken Mirrors”a modestly gripping story of remorse mixed with revenge, Roger Moore, Movie Nation
Movie Review: ‘Broken Mirrors’ : "Aan excellent, well-paced script" ,Lisa Payne, Red Carpet Crash
Movie Review: Boken Mirrors, Matthew Huntley, Box office prophets
Israeli drama films
2018 drama films
2018 films